In particle physics, a hyperon is any baryon containing one or more strange quarks, but no charm, bottom, or top quark. This form of matter may exist in a stable form within the core of some neutron stars. Hyperons are sometimes generically represented by the symbol Y.

History and research 
The first research into hyperons happened in the 1950s and spurred physicists on to the creation of an organized classification of particles.

The term was coined by French physicist Louis Leprince-Ringuet in 1953, and announced for the first time at the cosmic ray conference at Bagnères de Bigorre in July of that year, agreed upon by Leprince-Ringuet, Bruno Rossi, C.F. Powell, William B. Fretter and Bernard Peters.

Today, research in this area is carried out on data taken at many facilities around the world, including CERN, Fermilab, SLAC, JLAB, Brookhaven National Laboratory, KEK, GSI and others. Physics topics include searches for CP violation, measurements of spin, studies of excited states (commonly referred to as spectroscopy), and hunts for exotic forms such as pentaquarks and dibaryons.

Properties and behavior 

Being baryons, all hyperons are fermions. That is, they have half-integer spin and obey Fermi–Dirac statistics. Hyperons all interact via the strong nuclear force, making them types of hadron. They are composed of three light quarks, at least one of which is a strange quark, which makes them strange baryons. 

Excited hyperon resonances and ground-state hyperons with a '*' included in their notation decay via the strong interaction. For Ω⁻ as well as the lighter hyperons this decay mode is not possible given the particle masses and the conservation of flavor and isospin necessary in strong interactions. Instead, these decay weakly with non-conserved parity. An exception to this is the Σ⁰ which decays electromagnetically into Λ on account of carrying the same flavor quantum numbers. The type of interaction through which these decays occur determine the average lifetime, which is why weakly decaying hyperons are significantly more long-lived than those that decay through strong or electromagnetic interactions.

List

Notes:
 Since strangeness is conserved by the strong interactions, some ground-state hyperons cannot decay strongly. However, they do participate in strong interactions.
  may also decay on rare occurrences via these processes:
  →  +  + 
  →  +  + 
 The  has a baryon number of +1 and hypercharge of −2, giving it strangeness of −3. It takes multiple flavor-changing weak decays for it to decay into a proton or neutron. Murray Gell-Mann's and Yuval Ne'eman's SU(3) model (sometimes called the Eightfold Way) predicted this hyperon's existence, mass and that it will only undergo weak decay processes. Experimental evidence for its existence was discovered in 1964 at Brookhaven National Laboratory. Further examples of its formation and observation using particle accelerators confirmed the SU(3) model.

See also

 Delta baryon
 Hypernucleus
 List of baryons
 List of particles
 Physics portal
 Timeline of particle discoveries

References

 

Baryons
Exotic matter
Strange quark